William Tell is a 1960 Swiss adventure film directed by Michel Dickoff and Karl Hartl and starring Robert Freitag, Wolfgang Rottsieper and Alfred Schlageter. It is based on the traditional folk story of William Tell. The film was entered into the 2nd Moscow International Film Festival.

Cast
 Robert Freitag as Wilhelm Tell
 Wolfgang Rottsieper as Gessler
 Alfred Schlageter as Walter Fürst
 Hannes Schmidhauser as Arnold von Melchtal
 Leopold Biberti as Werner Stauffacher
 Maria Becker as Gertrud Stauffacher
 Heinz Woester as Attinghausen
 Georges Weiss as Rudenz
 Birke Bruck as Berta von Bruneck
 Zarli Carigiet as Baumgarten
 Helen Hesse as Baumgartnerin
 Paul Bühlmann as Rudi
 Inigo Gallo as Frieshart

References

External links
 

1960 films
Swiss historical adventure films
1960s historical adventure films
Films set in the 14th century
Films based on works by Friedrich Schiller
1960s German-language films
Cultural depictions of William Tell